Sunset Beach DJ Session is a mix DJ compilation by German producer and remixer ATB, which was released in 2010. It is a double-CD album, and includes songs by various DJs and producers, all mixed and compiled by ATB.

Track listing

CD 1
 ATB - Could you believe
 Yuri Kane - Right back
 Tim Berg - Bromance (Avicii's arena mix)
 Robert Babicz - Dark flower (Fever mix)
 George Acosta - Tearing me apart (feat. Fisher) (Gerry Cueto vocal remix)
 ATB - Touch & Go
 Tim Berg vs. Oliver Ingrosso & Otto Knows - Loopede
 LTN - One night in Ibiza 	
 ATB - Midnight sun 	
 Dash Berlin - Never cry again (Amurai's Los Angeles mix)
 Nic Chagall - This moment (feat. Jonathan Mendelsohn) (prog mix) 	
 Beltek - Eclipse
 D-Mad - She gave happiness (Arty Remix)
 Ferry Tayle & Static Blue - Trapeze

CD 2
 ATB & Josh Gallahan - Co 1724 	
 Tiësto - The tube (Domenico Cascarino & Luca Lombardi elektro acoustic mix) 	
 Sounds From The Ground - Moving into a new space (feat. Nicola Hitchcock)
 Asheni - Sweet suffering (DJ Sin Plomo mix) 	
 ATB - Remember that day 	
 Mylo - Emotion 98.6 	
 Edward Shearmur - Taxi ride 	
 Late Night Alumni - Empty streets 	
 Sans Souci - Puro (sunset mix) 	
 Atb - Fahrenheit 451 	
 Summer of Space - New found art 	
 Lux - Secret fish 	
 Schodt - Cinematico 	
 Röyksopp - Only this moment 	
 Alpha Child - Gamma ray (Franc Spangler remix)

ATB albums
DJ mix albums
2010 compilation albums